, better known by her stage name , is a Japanese actress and former idol singer.

Biography 

Nana Okada got her start in show business in the TV Asahi program "Anata o Star Ni!" (You Are a Star!) in 1974. She was signed to NAV Records and released her first single, "Hitorigoto" (Soliloquy), in May 1975.

In the spring of 1976 she released her biggest hit and signature song "" (The Hills of Youth), which reached the Oricon top 30. Other top 40 hits would follow, such as "Wakai Kisetsu" (The Young Season), "Teami no Present" (Hand-knitted Present) and "Soyokaze to Watashi" (The Breeze And I). Her last single was released in 1986.

Nana Okada has also acted in movies and drama series.

In May 1977, a man armed with a knife invaded Okada's apartment and held her captive for five hours before escaping. Okada was injured on both hands, but was otherwise not physically assaulted. The perpetrator was never identified, and Okada suffered a decline in popularity due to the media reporting which damaged her "innocent" image. When author and former yakuza George Abe interviewed Okada for Weekly Asahi Geinō years later, he revealed that he had been her admirer, and that when serving time in the Tokyo Detention House, he had met a fellow inmate who claimed to be the perpetrator of the crime and had beaten him up so severely that he would suffer "lifetime injuries".

Discography

Singles 
 Hitorigoto (10 May 1975)
 Jogakusei (25 Aug. 1975)
 Kuchizuke (10 Dec. 1975)
 Seishun no Sakamichi (10 Mar. 1976)
 Wakai Kisetsu (10 Jun. 1976)
 Teami no Present (10 Sep. 1976)
 Kazaranai Seishun (21 Dec. 1976)
 Soyokaze to Watashi (10 Apr. 1977)
 Love Step Jump (10 Jul. 1977)
 Kyūai Senka (25 Sep. 1977)
 Bye-bye Lullaby (10 Feb. 1978)
 Dame Desuka (25 Apr. 1978)
 Shonan Kaigan Dori (21 Sep. 1978)
 Kake (21 Mar. 1979)
 Quiet Dance (21 Oct. 1980)
 It's For You c/w Nagai Yoru (5 Feb. 1986)

Albums 
 Nana no Hitorigoto (25 Jul. 1975)
 Akogare (10 Dec. 1975)
 Seventeen! Okada Nana Birthday Concert (10 May 1976)
 Akushu Shiyou yo (25 Aug. 1976)
 Okada Nana Original Best Collection (Nov. 1976)
 77 Atarashii Nikkichou (25 Feb. 1977)
 Cream Soda (25 Aug. 1977)
 Okada Nana Best 24 (Dec. 1977)
 Bye-bye Lullaby / Ai no Finale (25 Mar. 1978)
 Mr. Arranger (5 Nov. 1978)

Filmography

Films
 G.I. Samurai (1979) - Kazuko Arai
 Nomugi Pass II (Ā, Nomugi tōge: Shinryoku hen) (1982) - Ai Kawai
 Hometown (1983) - Fuku
 Hakujasho (1983) - Yasue
 Okinawan Boys (1983)
 Legend of the Eight Samurai (1983) - Hamaji
 Love & Pop (1998) - Hiromi's Mother
  (2016) - Kyoko Akamatsu

Television
 Momotarō-zamurai (1980) - Okyō
 Sanga Moyu (1984)

See also 

 Kayōkyoku
 List of Japanese idols

References 

1959 births
Japanese women singers
Japanese idols
Living people